Skid boots are used to protect a horse's hind legs during exercise and competition, protecting the fetlocks, pasterns, and other parts of the lower leg from injury that may occur from a sliding stop. Taller varieties may also provide protection if one leg or hoof strikes the opposite leg. They are commonly seen on horses in western riding sports such as cutting, reining and other events where quick stops and fast turns on the hindquarters may be required.

Skid boots are usually made of synthetic materials such as Neoprene or traditional materials such as leather.  They usually attach by a wide  velcro fastening which is pulled around the leg.  Some boots may have buckles, especially older designs.   They are made in a wide variety of colors and of varying styles.

See also
Brushing boots
Polo wraps
Shipping bandages

Horse protective equipment